Orbivestus cinerascens is a plant in the family Asteraceae.

Description
The capitula feature purplish flowers. The fruits are achenes.

Distribution and habitat
Orbivestus cinerascens is native to many parts of Africa and also to the Arabian Peninsula and Indian subcontinent.

References

External links
Orbivestus cinerascens African Plants – A Photo Guide

Vernonieae
Flora of Africa
Flora of the Arabian Peninsula
Flora of the Indian subcontinent
Plants described in 1867